Raúl Tamudo Montero (born 19 October 1977) is a Spanish retired professional footballer who played as a striker.

An icon at Espanyol, he captained the club for almost a decade, playing nearly 400 official games, winning two Copa del Rey and being their all-time top goal scorer with 140 goals.

He amassed La Liga totals of 407 matches and 146 goals over 17 seasons, also representing in the competition Real Sociedad and Rayo Vallecano.

Club career

Espanyol
Born in Santa Coloma de Gramenet, Barcelona, Catalonia, Tamudo was a product of RCD Espanyol's youth ranks who bought him from local UDA Gramenet for six footballs, and he served two Segunda División six-month loans before finally settling in 1999–2000. From there on he became an undisputed starter for the team, never scoring in single digits during nine La Liga seasons and helping the Pericos to two Copa del Rey trophies: in the 2000 final against Atlético Madrid, he netted by stealing the ball from goalkeeper Toni Jiménez with his head; he also played a vital role in the 2006 edition, scoring in the second minute of the match and subsequently assisting Luis García on the second goal.

Tamudo was close to signing with Rangers in 2000, only to see the move fail at the last minute due to a failed medical. Two days later, he scored once in the UEFA Cup match against Grazer AK (4–0 home win, 4–1 aggregate).
 
On the last matchday of the 2006–07 campaign, Tamudo reached 112 goals scored in the first division, making him the top all-time scorer for Espanyol: his brace in the 2–2 away draw against city rivals FC Barcelona on 9 June 2007 took him past former Blanquiazul star Marañón's 1983 record of 111, and allowed Real Madrid to clinch the league title. In that year's UEFA Cup, he contributed with two goals in seven games to the side's runner-up campaign which ended at the hands of fellow league side Sevilla FC and, merely four months after that match, he struck three minutes from time to give Espanyol a 3–2 win at the same rival.

Some injury problems and loss of form limited Tamudo in the following two seasons, and he lost the starting job midway through 2008–09 to newly signed Uruguayan Iván Alonso; however, in the last matchday, he scored three past Málaga CF in a 3–0 home success – which was good enough for leading the team in goals once again, at six – being replaced to a standing ovation.

2009–10 was nothing short of disastrous for Tamudo, in sporting terms: again, he struggled with some injuries, was ostracised by manager and former teammate Mauricio Pochettino, who also deprived him of his captain armband during preseason, in favour of club youth graduate Daniel Jarque, and confronted the board of directors over contractual issues; his status was further diminished in the January transfer window, with the signing of another Argentine, Dani Osvaldo, and he eventually finished the campaign with only six league games and no goals.

Later years
In early August 2010, at nearly 33, Tamudo signed a one-year contract with Real Sociedad, who returned to the top division after a three-year absence. He scored three times in his first four official appearances, but the Basques only collected one point, losing against Real Madrid (1–2, home) and CA Osasuna (1–3).

On 26 August 2011, Tamudo moved to Rayo Vallecano on a one-year deal, freshly promoted to the top level. He was a starter throughout most of his first season, notably scoring against his main club Espanyol but in a 5–1 away loss; on 13 May 2012, he was brought from the bench to net the game's only goal in the 90th minute at home against Granada CF in the last matchday, with the Madrid outskirts team finally avoiding relegation at the expense of Villarreal CF.

Tamudo moved abroad for the first time at the age of 34, joining Mexico's C.F. Pachuca on 14 June 2012. On 11 December, after failing to find the net, he was released, returning to his country and Rayo on the last day of the January transfer window.

Tamudo scored in only his second match in his second spell, not being able however to prevent a 3–1 loss at Barcelona on 17 March 2013. In the subsequent off-season, he signed for one year with second-level side CE Sabadell FC.

At the start of the 2014–15 campaign, Tamudo netted four times in the first six league games, helping his team to the tenth place in the table. However, during training in October, he suffered an internal meniscus injury to his right knee, going on to be sidelined for several months and being deemed surplus to requirements when he returned to full fitness; Sabadell returned to Segunda División B, and he announced his retirement on 5 September 2015 at the age of 37.

In December 2022, it was announced that Tamudo, along with other renowned retired footballers, would participate in the Kings League, a seven-a-side football league organised by different internet personalities such as Ibai Llanos or TheGrefg, as well as former football players such as Gerard Piqué or Iker Casillas. In January 2023 he made his debut in Ibai Llanos' team Porcinos FC, being the star of the team together with the Mexican Javier Hernández.

International career
A full international since 16 August 2000 (Germany-Spain, 4–1 loss), Tamudo returned to the lineup after a two-year absence to score a vital goal in a 3–1 UEFA Euro 2008 qualifier away win against Denmark on 13 October 2007. Incidentally, Espanyol teammate Albert Riera also scored. He played a total of 13 games with the Spain National Football Team, in which he scored 5 goals.

Previously, Tamudo was part of Spain's silver medal-winning team at the 2000 Summer Olympics, netting in the semi-final match against the United States.

Career statistics

Club

International goals
Scores and results list Spain's goal tally first, score column indicates score after each Tamudo goal.

Honours
Espanyol
Copa del Rey: 1999–2000, 2005–06
UEFA Cup runner-up: 2006–07

Spain U23
Summer Olympic silver medal: 2000

See also
 List of La Liga players (400+ appearances)

References

External links
 
 
 
 

1977 births
Living people
People from Santa Coloma de Gramenet
Sportspeople from the Province of Barcelona
Spanish footballers
Footballers from Catalonia
Association football forwards
La Liga players
Segunda División players
Segunda División B players
RCD Espanyol B footballers
RCD Espanyol footballers
Deportivo Alavés players
UE Lleida players
Real Sociedad footballers
Rayo Vallecano players
CE Sabadell FC footballers
Liga MX players
C.F. Pachuca players
Spain youth international footballers
Spain under-21 international footballers
Spain under-23 international footballers
Spain international footballers
Footballers at the 2000 Summer Olympics
Olympic footballers of Spain
Olympic medalists in football
Medalists at the 2000 Summer Olympics
Olympic silver medalists for Spain
Catalonia international footballers
Spanish expatriate footballers
Expatriate footballers in Mexico
Spanish expatriate sportspeople in Mexico